The Rhythm Of My Life: Ismael Sankara  is a short documentary film produced in Libreville, Gabon. It is written, directed and produced by Franck A. Onouviet and Marc A. Tchicot. The music is composed by Michael “Mike Mef” Mefane and Rodney “Hokube” Ndong-Eyogo. It focuses on musical moments between people  sharing a strong passion for their craft and an in depth and personal interview of rapper Ismael Sankara. The documentary is presenting a new recording artist with a passion going further than the name he is carrying.

Synopsis

The Rhythm Of My Life: Ismael Sankara follows in an unconventional way the journey of Ismael "Ish" Sankara, a former Miami based rapper, who traveled to Africa to visit family. Little did he know that Libreville (Gabon) would be the place where the project of his dreams would fall in his lap.

Cast 
 Ismael Sankara: Himself
 Michael "Mike Mef" Mefane: Himself
 Rodney "Hokube" Ndong-Eyogo: Himself
 Hamed Mouliom: Cab driver

Release 
The film was first available for streaming on the Arte Creative website, from March 25 to March 27, 2011. Since then, it has been deleted from the site and since has only been screened during film festivals.

Festival run 
Since its first diffusion, the short documentary had a worldwide festival run, including:

 64th Cannes Film Festival (Short Film Corner of the Marché du Film )
 15th Urbanworld Film Festival (Official Selection, Short Documentary category).
 5th Nashville Black Film Festival (Official Selection, Short Documentary category)
 Amiens International Film Festival (Retrospective of gabonese cinema).
 10th San Diego Black Film Festival (Official Selection, Short Documentary category)
 Cinemafrica Festival (Sweden).
 7th ÉCU The European Independent Film festival  (Audience Award, Non-European Short Documentary category)
 5th Indie Spirit Film Festival (Official Selection, Short Documentary category)

Notes and references

 http://www.shadowandact.com/?p=42964
 http://www.jewanda-magazine.com/2011/04/cinema-the-rythm-of-my-life-ismael-sankara/
 http://www.westwax.com/home/2011/4/24/the-rhythm-of-my-life.html
 http://www.djobusyproductions.com/vu_therythmofmylife.php

External links 
 
 

2011 films
Gabonese documentary films
2011 short documentary films
Films set in Gabon
Documentary films about African music
2010s English-language films